The 1993 Big East Conference baseball tournament was held at Muzzy Field in Bristol, Connecticut. This was the ninth annual Big East Conference baseball tournament. The fourth seeded  won their fourth tournament championship and claimed the Big East Conference's automatic bid to the 1993 NCAA Division I baseball tournament.

Format and seeding 
The Big East baseball tournament was a 4 team double elimination tournament in 1993. The top four teams were seeded one through four based on conference winning percentage only.

Bracket

Jack Kaiser Award 
Mike Maerten was the winner of the 1993 Jack Kaiser Award. Maerten was a pitcher for St. John's.

References 

Tournament
Big East Conference Baseball Tournament
Big East Conference baseball tournament
Big East Conference baseball tournament
College baseball tournaments in Connecticut
Bristol, Connecticut
Sports competitions in Hartford County, Connecticut